Kobylin or Gmina Kobylin, where "gmina" stands for an administrative district,  may refer to the following places:
Kobylin in Greater Poland Voivodeship (west-central Poland)
Kobylin, Ciechanów County in Masovian Voivodeship (east-central Poland)
Kobylin, Grójec County in Masovian Voivodeship (east-central Poland)
Gmina Kobylin in Krotoszyn County, Greater Poland Voivodeship (west-central Poland)
Kobylin, Łódź Voivodeship (central Poland)
Kobylin, Maków County in Masovian Voivodeship (east-central Poland)
Kobylin, Ostrołęka County in Masovian Voivodeship (east-central Poland)
Kobylin, Podlaskie Voivodeship (north-east Poland)
Kobylin, Warmian-Masurian Voivodeship (north Poland)
Gmina Kobylin-Borzymy in Wysokie Mazowieckie County, Podlaskie Voivodeship (north-eastern Poland), with the following villages:
Kobylin-Borzymy 
Kobylin-Cieszymy
Kobylin-Kruszewo
Kobylin-Kuleszki
Kobylin-Latki
Kobylin-Pieniążki
Kobylin-Pogorzałki

See also
Kobylin (surname)